Shimoyama is a Japanese surname. Notable people with the surname include:

, Japanese basketball player
, Japanese classical composer
, Japanese freestyle skier
, Japanese baseball player
, Japanese basketball player
, Japanese voice actor

Japanese-language surnames